Myneni Hariprasada Rao, ( M.H.P. Rao, 21 July 1927 – 5 April 2016) was born in Edlalanka village near Avanigadda,  is a retired Director of the Nuclear Power Board (now known as NPCL) of DAE, Mumbai, India. He has served for many years as a member of Southern, Western and Northern Indian Regional electricity boards. 

Dr. Myneni Hari Prasad Rao was considered as the architect of the Madras Atomic Power Station (MAPS) and its first project director.

Biography

MHP Rao has a master's degree in Power Systems Engineering from Illinois Institute of technology. He has authored many articles and research papers.

Awards
During his career, MHP Rao has received several awards, including the Padma Shri (1984) and the Sanjay Gandhi Award for contribution in Science and Technology (1983).

Social service
Through his YEMKAY trust, he has conducted free Homeopathy clinics in Avanigadda, Edlalanka, Mynenivaripalem, Challapalli, repalle and Gudivada.

The recent spate of floods in Krishna river has left the village of Edlalanka submerged. Flood relief efforts under his direction are underway to restore proper drinking water and medicines to the villagers

References

Madras Atomic Power Station marks silver jubilee
 http://www.thehindubusinessline.in/2002/02/07/stories/2002020700590200.htm
 http://www.thaindian.com/newsportal/uncategorized/as-n-deal-moves-forward-scientists-walk-down-nostalgia-lane-lead_10075328.html
 http://www.udayavani.com/showstory.asp?news=0&contentid=635590&lang=1

Recipients of the Padma Shri in science & engineering
Telugu people
1927 births
2016 deaths
People from Krishna district